Elizabeth Ryan and Helen Wills Moody were the defending champions, but did not participate.

Phyllis Mudford and Dorothy Shepherd-Barron defeated Doris Metaxa and Josane Sigart in the final, 3–6, 6–3, 6–4 to win the ladies' doubles tennis title at the 1931 Wimbledon Championships.

Seeds

  Eileen Fearnley-Whittingstall /  Betty Nuthall (semifinals)
  Cilly Aussem /  Hilde Krahwinkel (second round)
  Peggy Michell /  Phoebe Watson (third round)
  Doris Metaxa /  Josane Sigart (final)

Draw

Finals

Top half

Section 1

The nationality of Mrs JC Bell is unknown.

Section 2

Bottom half

Section 3

Section 4

References

External links

Women's Doubles
Wimbledon Championship by year – Women's doubles
Wimbledon Championships - Doubles
Wimbledon Championships - Doubles